Chinese Gourmet Express (aka CGE) is a fast food American restaurant chain serving Americanized Chinese cuisine.

History
Samuel Y. Sim started the chain in 1990 in the Sherman Oaks Galleria.  In 2002, he began the Sansei chain of Japanese restaurants.

According to their website, "Fifteen years after they opened their first restaurant, Sam and Monica export their unique vision throughout California and the country in the Northwest, Rockies, Texas, Midwest and Northeast."

See also
 List of Chinese restaurants

References

External links
 

1990 establishments in California
Chinese restaurants in the United States
Fast-food chains of the United States
Regional restaurant chains in the United States
Restaurants established in 1990
Restaurants in Los Angeles